Hiro Nicolas Vallar (born 22 October 1983) is a footballer from Papeete, Tahiti currently playing for A.S. Central Sport. He is a member of Tahiti national football team.

Career
Vallar started his career with SCO Angers before signing for Montpellier HSC reserve team in 2001 to play at CFA, the fourth tier of football in France. In 2003, he left Montpellier and joined Sète, where he played for 3 years and managed to achieve promotion to Ligue 2 in 2005, only to be relegated back to Championnat National in the following season.

Playing only 7 matches at the Ligue 2 campaign, Vallar left for Penafiel in 2006. Without a single appearance with the Portuguese club, he was released in 2007, joining Réunionese club AS Excelsior in 2008, returning to France in the same year to play for CFA club FC Montceau.

In 2009, Vallar returned to his homeland to play for AS Dragon, winning the Tahiti First Division in 2011–12.

International career
Vallar was part of Tahiti U-20 at 2001 OFC U-20 Championship scoring in 6–2 win against New Caledonia.

Vallar made his debut for the senior team during 2012 OFC Nations Cup, being the team's captain, scoring twice from the penalty spot and receiving the Golden Ball award as Tahiti won the competition for the first time.
Vallar was in the Tahitian team in the 2013 Confederations Cup. He scored an own goal in a 6–1 loss to Nigeria.

International goals

Honours

AS Dragon
Tahiti First Division: 2012

Tahiti
OFC Nations Cup: 2012

International career statistics

References

External links

1983 births
Living people
People from Papeete
French Polynesian footballers
FC Sète 34 players
F.C. Penafiel players
AS Excelsior players
FC Montceau Bourgogne players
2012 OFC Nations Cup players
2013 FIFA Confederations Cup players
2016 OFC Nations Cup players
Association football defenders
French Polynesian expatriate footballers
Tahiti international footballers
Expatriate footballers in Belgium
Tahitian expatriate sportspeople in Belgium
Expatriate footballers in Portugal